The Nurse from Brooklyn is a 1938 American drama film, directed by S. Sylvan Simon for Universal Pictures. It stars  Sally Eilers, Paul Kelly, and Larry J. Blake.

Cast
 Sally Eilers as Elizabeth Thomas
 Paul Kelly as Jim Barnes
 Larry J. Blake as Larry Craine
 Maurice Murphy as Danny Thomas
 Morgan Conway as Inspector Donohue
 David Olivier as Detective Branch
 Lucile Gleason as 'Ma' Hutchins

References

External links
The Nurse from Brooklyn at the Internet Movie Database

1938 films
Films directed by S. Sylvan Simon
Universal Pictures films
1938 crime drama films
American crime drama films
American black-and-white films
1930s English-language films
1930s American films